Bezimenne is a village in Novoazovsk Raion (district) in Donetsk Oblast of eastern Ukraine controlled by Russia at 133 km SSE from the centre of Donetsk city, on the shore of the Sea of Azov.

The settlement was taken under control of pro-Russian forces during the War in Donbass, which started in 2014.

Demographics
Native language as of the Ukrainian Census of 2001:
Ukrainian — 53.71%
Russian — 45.19%
Armenian — 0.80%
Greek — 0.08%
Bulgarian, German, and Moldavian — 0.04%

References

Villages in Kalmiuske Raion